General elections were held in Turkey on 27 October 1957. The electoral system used was the multiple non-transferable vote, with each electoral district electing an average of nine members. The result was a victory for the Democrat Party, which won 424 of the 610 seats.

Results

References

Turkey
Turkey
General elections in Turkey
General